Major-General Sir Percy Cleghorn Stanley Hobart,  (14 June 1885 – 19 February 1957), also known as "Hobo", was a British military engineer noted for his command of the 79th Armoured Division during the Second World War. He was responsible for many of the specialised armoured vehicles ("Hobart's Funnies") that took part in the invasion of Normandy and later actions.

Early life
Hobart was born in Naini Tal, British India, to Robert T. Hobart (of the Indian Civil Service), and Janetta (née Stanley). His mother was born in County Tyrone and lived at Roughan Park, near Newmills, between Cookstown and Dungannon. She married Robert Hobart in Tullaniskin Parish Church, Dungannon, on 7 October 1880.

In his youth, Hobart studied history, painting, literature and church architecture. He was educated at Temple Grove School and Clifton College, and in 1904 he graduated from the Royal Military Academy, Woolwich and was commissioned into the Royal Engineers. He was first sent to India, but during the First World War he served in France and Mesopotamia (now Iraq). He took part in the Waziristan campaign 1919–1920, when British and Indian Army forces put down unrest in local villages.

Attending the Staff College, Camberley, in 1920, in 1923, foreseeing the predominance of tank warfare, Hobart volunteered to be transferred to the Royal Tank Corps. While there, he gained the nickname "Hobo", and was greatly influenced by the writings of B. H. Liddell Hart on armoured warfare. He was appointed as an instructor at the Staff College, Quetta, in 1923 where he served until 1927. In November 1928, Hobart married Dorothea Field, the daughter of Colonel C. Field, Royal Marines. They had one daughter. His sister, Elizabeth, married Bernard Montgomery.

In 1934, Hobart became brigadier of the first permanent armoured brigade in Britain and Inspector, Royal Tank Corps. He had to fight for resources for his command because the British Army was still dominated by conservative cavalry officers. German General Heinz Guderian kept abreast of Hobart's writings using, at his own expense, someone to translate all of Hobart's articles being published in Britain.

In 1937, Hobart was made Deputy Director of Staff Duties (Armoured Fighting Vehicles) and later Director of Military Training. He was promoted to major general. In 1938, Hobart was sent to form and train "Mobile Force (Egypt)" although a local general resisted his efforts. While sometimes referred to as the "Mobile Farce" by critics, Mobile Force (Egypt) survived and later became the 7th Armoured Division, famous as the "Desert Rats".

Second World War
General Sir Archibald Wavell dismissed Hobart into retirement in 1940, based on hostile War Office information due to his "unconventional" ideas about armoured warfare. Hobart joined the Local Defence Volunteers (precursor to the Home Guard) as a lance corporal and was charged with the defence of his home town, Chipping Campden. "At once, Chipping Campden became a hedgehog of bristling defiance", and Hobart was promoted to become Deputy Area Organiser. Liddell Hart criticised the decision to retire Hobart and wrote an article in the newspaper Sunday Pictorial. Winston Churchill was notified and he had Hobart recalled into the army over Chief of the Imperial General Staff Alan Brooke's objections in 1941. Hobart was assigned to train the 11th Armoured Division, a task which was recognised as extremely successfully achieved.

Hobart's detractors tried again to have him removed, this time on medical grounds but Churchill rebuffed them. He was relatively old (57) for active command and he had been ill. Once again, Hobart was assigned to raise and train a fresh armoured division, this time the 79th Armoured Division.

79th Armoured Division
The Dieppe Raid in August 1942 had demonstrated the inability of regular tanks and infantry to cope with fortified obstacles in an amphibious landing. This showed the need for specialised vehicles to cope with natural and man-made obstructions during and after the Allied invasion of Europe.

In March 1943, Hobart's 79th Armoured was about to be disbanded, due to lack of resources, but the Chief of the Imperial General Staff (CIGS), General Sir Alan Brooke, in a "happy brainwave", invited Hobart to convert his division into a unit of specialised armour. Hobart was reputedly suspicious at first and conferred with Liddell Hart before accepting, with the assurance that it would be an operational unit with a combat role.  The unit was renamed the "79th (Experimental) Armoured Division Royal Engineers". Unit insignia was a black bull's head with flaring nostrils superimposed over a yellow triangle; this was carried proudly on every vehicle. Hobart's brother-in-law, General Sir Bernard Montgomery, informed the American general Dwight D. Eisenhower of his need to build specialised tanks.

Under Hobart's leadership, the 79th assembled units of modified tank designs collectively nicknamed "Hobart's Funnies". These were used in the Normandy landings and were credited with helping the Allies get ashore. The 79th's vehicles were offered to all of the forces taking part in the landings of Operation Overlord, but the Americans declined all except the amphibious Sherman DD tank. Liddell Hart said of him: "To have moulded the best two British armoured divisions of the war was an outstanding achievement, but Hobart made it a "hat trick" by his subsequent training of the specialised 79th Armoured Division, the decisive factor on D-Day."

The vehicles of the 79th did not deploy as units together but were attached to other units.  By the end of the war the 79th had almost seven thousand vehicles.  The 79th Armoured Division was disbanded on 20 August 1945.

Hobart returned to retirement in 1946 and died in 1957 in Farnham, Surrey.

A barracks in Detmold, Germany, was named after him. Hobart Barracks has since been handed back to the German government and no longer functions as a barracks.

Awards and decorations
In 1943, Hobart was made a Knight Commander of the Order of the British Empire (KBE). After the war, he was awarded the American Legion of Merit. During his career, Hobart also became a Companion of the Order of the Bath (CB) and, for his actions in the First World War, received the Distinguished Service Order (DSO) and Military Cross (MC). During his military career he was also mentioned in despatches nine times.

Footnotes

References

Further reading

External links
Royal Engineers Museum  Royal Engineers biographies (Percy Hobart)
British Army Officers 1939–1945
Generals of World War II
Historical Warfare Major General Hobart

|-

|-

1885 births
1957 deaths
Academics of the Staff College, Quetta
British Army generals of World War II
British Army personnel of World War I
British Home Guard officers
Companions of the Order of the Bath
Companions of the Distinguished Service Order
Foreign recipients of the Legion of Merit
Graduates of the Staff College, Camberley
Graduates of the Royal Military Academy, Woolwich
Knights Commander of the Order of the British Empire
People educated at Clifton College
British Army major generals
Military personnel of British India
Royal Engineers officers
Recipients of the Military Cross